Aminuddin bin Zulkipli is a Malaysian politician and former Deputy Speaker of the Perak State Legislative Assembly.

Election results

References 

Living people
People from Perak
Malaysian people of Malay descent
National Trust Party (Malaysia) politicians
Former Malaysian Islamic Party politicians
21st-century Malaysian politicians
Year of birth missing (living people)
Members of the Perak State Legislative Assembly